K143 or K-143 may refer to:

K-143 (Kansas highway), a state highway in Kansas
HMCS Louisburg (K143), a former Canadian Navy ship